Malwas is a village and post in the Churu district of northern Rajasthan state, India.

The nearby town of Rajgarh (or Sadulpur) serves Malwas' transportation needs with its railway station. Rajgarh railway junction lies on the Bikaner - Churu- Delhi and Churu - Hisar railway routes. The nearest other cities are Sidhmukh, Hisar, Sikar and Pilani (Rajasthan). Malwas is part of the Lok Sabha constituency of Churu and the Vidhan Sabha constituency of Sadulpur.

As of June 2015, it had about 350 residents' homes.

As of 2015, there are about 350 households in Malwas. Malwas is the most growing village in Rajgarh Tehsil. The literacy rate is 80%. Agriculture is the chief occupation of the local population. The people residing in the community are Brahmin, Jat, Goswami, Jangir, Tak, Swami and Rajput.

Geography 

Malwas is located 25 km from Rajgarh where born Lakshmi Narayan Mittal, 225 km Delhi, 70 km Hissar, 230 km Jaipur and Near Haryana State Border. After from Malwas there start desert territory of Rajasthan.

It comes under Malwas Panchayath. It belongs to Bikaner Division. It is located 65 km towards the east from District headquarters Churu. It is 230 km from the state capital, Jaipur.

Malwas is surrounded by Behal Tehsil towards the east, Taranagar Tehsil towards the west, Siwani Tehsil towards the north, Pilani Tehsil towards the south.

Taranagar, Rajgarh, Pilani, and Churu are the nearby cities to Malwas.

Sub-villages in Malwas 
Malwas

Post about Malwas Village

Pincode details	 
Location	Pincode	state	District
Malwas	331701	Rajasthan	Churu

Transportation

Airports 

The nearest airports are New Delhi Airport and Jaipur Airport.

Rail 
Sadulpur Jn Railway Station and Suratpura Railway Station are the very nearby railway stations to Malwas. However, Rohtak Jn Railway Station is the major railway station 134 km near to Malwas.

Important places 

 Dadrewa, birthplace of Gogaji
 Shree Karni Mata temple (chainpura bada)
 Pilani, a nearby town, birthplace of industrialist Ghanshyam Das Birla and home to prestigious Birla Institute of Technology and Science, Pilani and CEERI (central electronics & electrical research institute) government of India
 Peer Aana Falsa, visiting place of Muslim Peer
 Baba Phool Nath Temple NAWA
 Hanuman Mandir place in Malwas

Notable people 

 Lakshmi Mittal, steel tycoon born in tehsil Sadulpur (Rajgarh) of Churu district
 Bimal Jalan, a former Governor of India's Reserve Bank and Rajya Sabha member
 Anupam Mittal, founder of www.shaddi.com
 Krishna Poonia, a Commonwealth Games gold medalist and renowned athlete

Demographics 
The Malwas village has a population of 1302, of which 698 are males while 604 are females as per Population Census 2011.

In Malwas village population of children with age 0–6 is 177 which makes up 13.59% of total population of village. The average sex ratio of Malwas village is 865 which is lower than the Rajasthan state average of 928. The child sex ratio for the Malwas as per census is 1058, higher than Rajasthan average of 888.

Malwas village has medium literacy rate compared to Rajasthan. In 2011, literacy rate of Malwas village was 58.40% compared to 66.11% of Rajasthan. In Malwas Male literacy stands at 67.81% while female literacy rate was 47.17%.

As per constitution of India and Panchyati Raaj Act, Malwas village is administrated by Sarpanch (Head of Village) who is elected representative of village.

Malwas data 2011 

Hindi is the local language here.

Pincodes near Malwas 
331023 (Sadulpur), 331303 (Sankhu Fort), 331301 (Rampura Beri)

Education

Colleges 
Tagore Gramothan Mahavidhyalay Ratanpura
Address: Jharsar Road vill - Ratanpura, post- Hadyal, teh- Rajgarh, dist- Churu, raj.

Ch. B.ed. Sansthan College
Address: Rajgarh

Mohta College
Address: Rajgarh

Government College Of Rajgarh
Address: Tehla Rd; Dist. Alwar; Rajgarh

C.r. Memorial T.t. College
Address: Taranagar A Rd Rajgarh

Villages in Churu district